The Bengal Nagpur Railway class NM was a class of ten 4-8-0+0-8-4 Garratt locomotives manufactured by Beyer, Peacock & Company in England. This was modified N class Garratt. It had Thermic siphon and arch tubes for better performance. It worked on the Bilaspur-Katni line and Anuppur-Chirmiri branch line for hauling coal. Probably because of Poppet valves, they retired early.

References

Steam locomotives of India
5 ft 6 in gauge locomotives
Beyer, Peacock locomotives
Railway locomotives introduced in 1931
Garratt locomotives
4-8-0+0-8-4 locomotives